Raffaello Gestro (21 March 1845, Genoa – 6 June 1936, Genoa) was an Italian entomologist who specialised in Coleoptera. Gestro was the Director of the Natural History Museum of Giacomo Doria Genoa where his collection is conserved. He was a Member and President of the Italian Entomological Society.

Works

Expedition Insects 
Indicating the amount and origin of insects collected for Genoa Natural History Museum from 1874-1895 
  
1874, 1876. Enumerazione dei Cetonidi raccolti nell´ Archipelago Malese e nella Papuasia dai signori G. Doria O. Beccari e L. M. D´Albertis e A. A. Bruyn. Annali del Museo Civico di Storia Naturale di Genova 6: 487-535,8: 512-524, 9: 83-100.  
1878. Contribuzione allo studio dei Cetonidi della regione Austro-Malese.Annali del Museo Civico di Storia Naturale di Genova 12: 26-31.  
1881. Spedizione Italiana Africa Equatoriale (1880-1884). Annali del Museo Civico di Storia Naturale di Genova 16: 204.  
1888. Viaggio di Leonardo Fea in Birmania e regioni vicine. IV. Nuove speciedi Coleotteri. Annali del Museo Civico di Storia Naturale di Genova 26: 87-132, figs.
1889  Viaggio ad Assab nel Mar Rosso dei Signori G. Doria ed O. Beccari con il R. Avviso “Esploratore” dal 16 Novembre 1879 al 26 Febbraio 1880. IV. Coleotteri. Annali del Museo Civico di Storia Naturale di Genova (Serie 2a) 7(27):5-72.
1890. Sopra alcune Cetonie dell´isola Nias e della costa occidentale di Sumatra raccolte dal Dott. Elio Modigliani. Annali del Museo Civico di Storia Naturale di Genova:  93-99.
1891. Viaggio di Leonardo Fea in Birmania e regioni vicine. XXXVII.Enumerazione delle Cetonie. Annali del Museo Civico di Storia Naturale di Genova ser. 2,vol. 10: 835-876. pl. II.  
1893. Viaggio di Lamberto Loria della Papuasia orientale, X, Nuove specie di Coleotteri Annali del Museo Civico di Storia Naturale di Genova ser. 2, vol. 13: 285-293.  
1895. Esplorazione del Giuba. 16. Coleotteri. Annali del Museo Civico di Storia Naturale di Genova(2a) 15 (35): 247-478.
1895 Esplorazione del Giuba e dei suoi affluenti compiuta dal Cap. V. Bottego (1892-93), Coleotteri XVI, Fam. Buprestidae. Annali del Museo Civico di Storia Naturale di Genova (2) 15:247-478 (338-350).

Taxonomic

1910. Pars 1. Rhysodidae and  Pars 5. Cupedidae, Paussidae.in S. Schenkling (ed.), Coleopterorum Catalogus. W. Junk, Berlin.

 
References
 Conci, C. & Poggi, R. 1996: Iconography of Italian Entomologists, with essential biographical data. Mem. Soc. Ent. Ital.'' 75 159-382.

External links
 Scarab Workers Bio

Italian entomologists
Coleopterists
1845 births
1936 deaths